Anatoliy Stepanovych Danylenko (4 March 1953 - 6 February 2021, Karapyshi, Myronivka Raion, Kyiv Oblast) was a Ukrainian politician who had served as the governor of Cherkasy Oblast from 1998 to 1999.

He also served as a member of the Verkhovna Rada from 1994 to 1998.

He died on 6 February 2021.

References

External links 
 Anatoliy Danylenko at the Official Ukraine Today portal

1953 births
Living people
People from Kyiv Oblast
Peasant Party of Ukraine politicians
People's Party (Ukraine) politicians
Governors of Cherkasy Oblast
Second convocation members of the Verkhovna Rada
Recipients of the Honorary Diploma of the Cabinet of Ministers of Ukraine